Nephronectin is a protein that in humans is encoded by the NPNT gene.

References

Further reading